Iris nusairiensis is a species in the genus Iris, it is also in the subgenus Scorpiris. It is a bulbous perennial from Syria, it has pale blue or white flowers. It is cultivated as an ornamental plant in temperate regions.

Description
Iris nusairiensis is fairly similar in form to Iris aucheri.

It has a brown bulb with long fleshy storage roots.

It generally has about 6 glossy mid-green, lanceolate leaves rising from the base of the stem.

It has various shades of blue-white flowers, ranging from pale blue/ light blue to white-blue flowers. The flowers all have a pale yellow or yellow crest on the falls. It also has darker blue veining on the hafts.

Taxonomy
It was published by Paul Mouterde in 'Nouvelle Flora du Liban et de la Syrie' (New flora of Libya and Syria) 311, in 1966.

The Latin specific epithet nusairiensis comes from 'Jebel Nusair' (meaning Nusair's mountain) in Syria, near Mount Cassius, part of the Nusair chain.

It has the common name of 'Syriansk junoiris' in Swedish.

Iris nusairiensis is now an accepted name by the RHS, and it was verified by United States Department of Agriculture and the Agricultural Research Service on 4 April 2003 and updated on 3 December 2004.

Distribution and habitat
It is native to temperate areas of western Asia.

Range
It is found in Syria.

Habitat
They are grown on rocky positions.

Conservation
It is listed as one of the significant plants in Syria.

Cultivation
Similar to other Juno irises it prefers well drained soils in full sun. It is better to grow in an alpine house or bulb frame in the UK.

It is not a very widely cultivated by specialist bulb growers, so is difficult to obtain.

Another form of Iris nusairiensis was found in SE Turkey, around the Malatya province, similar in form with three very large creamy-white flowers with a large round rich egg-yolk yellow patch on its falls. But some discussions by botanists think it might be a separate species.

References

Other sources
 Aldén, B., S. Ryman & M. Hjertson. 2009. Våra kulturväxters namn - ursprung och användning. Formas, Stockholm (Handbook on Swedish cultivated and utility plants, their names and origin).
 Mathew, B. 1981. The Iris. 157.

External links
Close-up image of Iris nusariensis on flickr
Photo of Iris nusariensis seeds

nusairiensis
Plants described in 1966
Flora of Syria